Jack Oliver Ian Campbell (born 11 November 1999) is an English cricketer. In July 2018, he played for the England under-19 cricket team against South Africa. He made his first-class debut on 26 March 2019, for Durham MCCU against Durham, as part of the Marylebone Cricket Club University fixtures. He made his Twenty20 debut on 30 June 2021, for Durham in the 2021 T20 Blast. He made his List A debut on 22 July 2021, for Durham in the 2021 Royal London One-Day Cup.

References

External links
 

1999 births
Living people
English cricketers
Durham MCCU cricketers
Durham cricketers
Hampshire cricketers
Cricketers from Portsmouth